William Jonas Armstrong is an Irish actor known for playing the title role in the BBC One drama series Robin Hood.

Career
In 2003, Armstrong appeared in Quartermaine's Terms at the Royal Theatre in Northampton as Derek Meadle. In 2004, he appeared in seven episodes of the fourth series of the British television comedy-drama, Teachers on Channel 4, as Anthony Millington. In 2005, he appeared again on Channel 4 in the crime drama series The Ghost Squad as Pete Maitland. In December 2006, he starred in the two-part crime drama Losing Gemma on ITV.

His first major television role came in October 2006 when he played Robin of Locksley, in the BBC's 2006 series based on Robin Hood. During filming of the second series, (which aired in 2007) Armstrong broke a metatarsal bone in his foot during a staged fight scene. He was a guest panelist on the BBC comedy panel game show Never Mind the Buzzcocks on 28 February 2007.

In August 2008, the BBC confirmed that Armstrong would be leaving Robin Hood at the end of the third season, which aired on 27 June 2009, citing his statement that he was "looking for new challenges". BBC replied to his words by explaining that "he'll be desperately missed". The show was subsequently not renewed for a fourth series. In 2008 he appeared in the horror film Book of Blood which is based on a short story by Clive Barker.

He appeared in Episode 3 of the third series of BBC serial The Street broadcast on 27 July 2009, playing the role of TA soldier Private Nick Calshaw who returns from Afghanistan with a facial disfigurement and a prosthetic hand after being injured by a suicide bomber whom he was unable to shoot. In January 2009, he read four CBeebies Bedtime stories on "The Bedtime Hour".

In November 2013, Armstrong received a "Stars on Horizon" award for Walking with the Enemy at the Fort Lauderdale International Film Festival.

In 2019, Armstrong appeared in the ITV drama series The Bay, where he played Sean Meredith.
In 2021, Armstrong starred in the 2021 ITV series Hollington Drive.

On 16 February 2023, it was announced that Armstrong will star in the upcoming ITV's six-part mystery thriller series titled After the Flood as Lee.

Filmography

Film

Television

Theatre
 Quartermaine's Terms (Royal Theatre, Northampton 2003)
 The Skin of Our Teeth (Young Vic Theatre, London 2004)
 Rutherford & Son (Royal Exchange Theatre, Manchester 2005)

References

External links
 

1981 births
Alumni of RADA
Living people
People educated at Arnold School
Male actors from Dublin (city)
People from Lytham St Annes
English people of Irish descent
English male television actors